The Cape Verde women's national football team represents Cape Verde in international women's association football and is governed by the Cape Verdean Football Federation.

History

Introduction
In 1985, almost no country in the world had a women's national football team, including Cape Verde who have yet to play in a FIFA sanctioned match. A national team from Cape Verde has not represented the country in the major regional and international tournaments. This includes the Women's World Cup, the 2010 African Women's Championships during the preliminary rounds., and the 2011 All Africa Games. In March 2012, the team was not ranked in the world by FIFA.

Background and development
Women's football in Africa in general faces several challenges, including limited access to education, poverty amongst women in the wider society, and fundamental inequality present in the society that occasionally allows for female specific human rights abuses. At the same time, if quality female players in Africa are developed, many leave their home countries to seek greater football opportunities in places like Northern Europe or the United States. Funding for women's football in Africa is also an issue:  Most of the funding for women's football and for the women's national teams comes from FIFA, not the national football association.

The development of football on a national level in Cape Verde is hindered by several factors, including local definitions of femininity that discourage participation in sport, lack of adequate training, a lack of competitive spirit in matches and during training. There is also a lack of available players, with participation rates having peaked at roughly 350 a few years back to roughly 200 current players. The lack of opportunities to go further with football inside the country also discourages continued participation in the sport.

Cape Verde's FIFA trigramme is CPV. The national association, Cape Verdean Football Federation, was founded in 1982 and became affiliated with FIFA in 1986. Between 1990 and 2010, no football administrators from the country attended FIFA run courses related solely to women's football though some attended courses about both men and women's football. Facilities were built to support football for everyone in 2001 when there was a surge of interest in the sport from women and youth players. In 2004, national football umpire training took place, with six of the twenty-six enrolled participants being women, with the women being expected to referee both men and women's matches.  Also that year, there were efforts to create a women's futsal competition in São Vicente. lha do Fogo had a women's futsal league in 2005 that included six teams.  In July 2011 on the island of St. Nicholas, the first women's soccer national championship was held in the country with EPIF da Praia being crowned the winners and Ajax de São Nicolau coming in second.  The national competition had six teams in its inaugural season including EPIF de São Vicente, Ajax de São Nicolau, EPIF da Praia, Académica do Sal, Académica da Boa Vista e Lém. Costs for the competition were covered by the national association. There were efforts to create the league by 2008. In 2011, a FIFA and the Cape Verdean Football Federation sponsored women's coaching clinic was held in the country.  The training was conducted by James Doyen French from Portugal and Francisco Baptista Asselan Khan of Mozambique.  The training was conducted to help demonstrate the national federation's commitment to women's football. In 2011, a women's football tournament was held in San Vicente. Rights to broadcast the 2011 Women's World Cup in the country were bought by African Union of Broadcasting.

Some female Cape Verdan footballers have gone on to play internationally for clubs in places like the Canary Islands with some of the earliest players joining clubs around 2001.  Other footballers have played abroad starting in 2004 in the Netherlands, Spain and Luxembourg.

Team image

Nicknames
The Cape Verde women's national football team has been known or nicknamed as the " ".

Home stadium
The Cape Verde women's national football team plays their home matches on...

Results and fixtures

The following is a list of match results in the last 12 months, as well as any future matches that have been scheduled.

Partial results are shown in parentheses.

Legend

2022

2023

Source :globalsportsarchive

All-time record

Key

The following table shows Cape Verde' all-time official international record per opponent:

Coaching staff

Current coaching staff

Manager history

Players

Current squad

This is the  convened selection for the 2023 WAFU Zone A Women's Cup named on January 2022 .

Caps and goals accurate up to and including 8 September 2021.

Recent call-ups
The following players have been called up to a Cape Verde squad in the past 12 months.

Previous squads
WAFU Zone A Women's Cup
2023 WAFU Zone A Women's Cup squads

Records

*Active players in bold, statistics correct as of 8 September 2021.

Most appearances

Top goalscorers

Competitive record

FIFA Women's World Cup

Olympic Games

*Draws include knockout matches decided on penalty kicks.

Africa Women Cup of Nations

WAFU Zone A Women's Cup

Honours

Continental

Regional
WAFU Zone A Women's Cup
Runners-up (1): 2023

See also

Cape Verde men's national football team

References

External links
 

Cape Verde women's national football team